Paul is a 2005 play by Howard Brenton, which portrays the life and career of Paul the Apostle.  It was first performed in the Cottesloe auditorium of the National Theatre, London from 30 September 2005 – 4 February 2006, in modern dress.

The press night was postponed due to the exhaustion of Paul Rhys and his replacement by Adam Godley, while the National received 200 letters of complaint even before opening night.  It portrayed Jesus as having survived the Crucifixion and his appearance to Paul outside Damascus as a chance encounter engineered by his wife Mary Magdalene and Peter rather than the vision which Paul takes it to be.

Cast
Cast and crew of the first production:

Crew
Director - Howard Davies
Designer - Vicki Mortimer
Lighting Designer - Paule Constable
Music - Dominic Muldowney
Sound Designer - John Leonard

Cast
Mary Magdalene - Kellie Bright
Nero - Richard Dillane
Ensemble - Tas Emiabata and Eugene Washington
Paul - Paul Rhys / Adam Godley 
James - Paul Higgins
Roman Gaoler - Dermot Kerrigan
Peter - Lloyd Owen
Yeshua (Jesus) - Pearce Quigley
Arab Trader - Howard Saddler
Barnabas - Colin Tierney

References

External links
Review in The Stage
Interview with Brenton in The Guardian

English plays
2005 plays
Stage portrayals of Jesus